Vitale Venzi (14 December 1903–16 July 1944) was an Italian cross-country skier. He competed in the men's 18 kilometre event at the 1928 Winter Olympics.

References

External links

1903 births
1944 deaths
Italian male cross-country skiers
Italian male Nordic combined skiers
Italian male ski jumpers
Olympic cross-country skiers of Italy
Olympic Nordic combined skiers of Italy
Olympic ski jumpers of Italy
Cross-country skiers at the 1928 Winter Olympics
Nordic combined skiers at the 1928 Winter Olympics
Ski jumpers at the 1928 Winter Olympics